Château La Serre is a château and vineyard in Gironde, Nouvelle-Aquitaine, France.

Châteaux in Gironde

Bordeaux wine producers